Sharon L. Zukin (born September 7, 1946) is an American professor of sociology who specializes in modern urban life. She teaches at Brooklyn College and the Graduate Center, City University of New York.  As of 2014, she was also a distinguished fellow in the Advanced Research Collaborative at the CUNY Graduate Center and chair of the Consumers and Consumption Section of the American Sociological Association. Zukin was a visiting professor at the University of Amsterdam in 2010–11.

Career and thought

Early career 
Zukin's academic training was focused on political sociology. She had not taken any specific courses in urban sociology before being hired to teach the subject to undergraduates at Brooklyn College. In an interview, she describes how she first immersed herself in urban sociology literature to aid her teaching, and was later inspired to carry out field research by reading a newspaper article about manufacturers who were being forced out of their loft space in Lower Manhattan. I said, I could help them—I’m a sociologist. Their landlord should not throw them out of their space. So I went to down to see them and did a little survey about their situation. I wound up advocating in support of their cause with the local community board and the city government, and eventually that turned into the research I did for my first urban book, Loft Living. And that’s really how I became an urban sociologist—by doing research.

Other early influences include Walter Benjamin's 1931 essay Paris, Capital of the Nineteenth Century and anthropologist Sidney Mintz's 1986 book Sweetness and Power: The Place of Sugar in Modern History.

Theoretical and political orientation 
Zukin's research interests and analytical framework place her in the broad category of Neo-Marxist social thinkers. She began teaching urban sociology just as the “new urban sociology” was emerging, partly in response to a series of urban riots (many of which involved African-Americans reacting to police brutality or other manifestations of systemic racism) that took place in U.S. cities in the late 1960s. Widespread urban unrest in the U.S. and Europe prompted worried governments and agencies to increase the funding for urban research. Sociologist Manuel Castells and geographer David Harvey were two of the theorists influential in developing the new urban sociology.

Zukin's view, at least in 1980, was that “For most of their history, urban sociologists seemed to serve the interests of the state as much as industrial sociologists served the interests of capital.” She and other sociologists influenced by the new urban sociology intended to take a different course. In contrast to the prevailing Chicago School and its ethnographic focus on communities, immigrants and settlement patterns, practitioners of this new, more interdisciplinary approach were concerned with the role of the state and with analyzing how "urban space is produced deliberately and in response to the needs of capital."

Contributions 

Zukin's research and publications focus on cities, how they change and why, culture (especially consumer culture) and real estate markets, particularly in New York City. Her books trace how cities have been reshaped through deindustrialization, gentrification, and immigration. She also writes about the rise of the symbolic economy, which is based on cultural production and consumption.

Loft Living 
Her first urban book, Loft Living (1982, 1989), is considered groundbreaking. In their 2013 book Gentrification, Loretta Lees, Tom Slater and Elvin Wyly call Loft Living the most influential study of the development of “loft identity” and praise Zukin for developing the concept of the “artistic mode of production.” This refers to the way in which major real estate investors have tried to use artists and culture industries to attract capital and stabilize precarious real estate markets. According to Google Scholar, Loft Living has been cited 1,367 times (October 18, 2014).

Authenticity 
In her most recent book, Naked City (2010), Zukin develops the concept of authenticity, the roots of which she traces back to ideas about an authentic self (meaning a self that is close to nature) found in Shakespeare and in the Romantic philosophy of Jean-Jacques Rousseau. More recently, she says a craving for authenticity developed as a reaction to the modernist standardization and homogenization of cities that took place in the 1950s and '60s.

While Zukin understands the craving for the authentic and admits to acting on it herself, she says the problem is that instead of being attributed to people, authenticity is now understood as an attribute of things (such as beer and cheese) and even experiences, which can be consumed. This leads to authenticity being "used as a lever of cultural power for a group to claim space and take it away from others without direct confrontation, with the help of the state and elected officials and the persuasion of the media and consumer culture." Through these processes of displacement and gentrification, she argues, New York City "lost its soul" in the early 21st century. The solution she proposes is to redefine authenticity and connect it back to the idea of "origins," then use it to support "the right to inhabit a space, not just consume it as an experience." Nodding to Henri Lefebvre and David Harvey's "right to the city" concept, she argues that "authenticity can suggest a 'right to the city,' a human right, that is cultivated by longtime residence, use, and habit.”

Praise and criticism of Jane Jacobs 

While Zukin is often called a critic of the work of Jane Jacobs, she is also an admirer. Zukin has called Jacobs “the iconic urban writer, against whom other urban writers must measure themselves” and “the person who, against all odds in the mid-twentieth century, extolled the messiness, the grittiness, the tentativeness, but also the firm friendships of city life.” Zukin categorizes Jacobs, like Herbert Gans, as a “socially conscious intellectual” who “defended the right of poor people not to be displaced.”

But Zukin differs from Jacobs in whom she considers the main antagonists when it comes to creating livable, equitable cities. Especially in her book The Death and Life of Great American Cities, Jacobs blames planners and the planning profession for destroying healthy, functional neighborhoods through forced urban renewal programs and for generally inflicting a "Great Blight of Dullness." Zukin sees this focus on planners as largely misguided and unhelpful because for her, planners are “a relatively powerless group compared to developers who build, and banks and insurance companies who finance the building that rips out a city’s heart.” But “for one reason or another,” Zukin writes, Jacobs “chose not to criticize the interests of capitalist developers who profit from displacing others.” As to why Jacobs wasn't harder on developers and financial institutions, Zukin speculates that the fact that she was funded by the Rockefeller Foundation, itself established and funded by corporate titan John D. Rockefeller and his heirs, might have played a role. In 1958, Jacobs received a grant from the foundation to develop her ideas about cities; the foundation published the result of that work as Death and Life in 1961. Zukin also points to Jacobs's connection to Time Inc., which published The Architectural Forum, where Jacobs held a staff position, and wonders whether Jacobs was influenced by a fear of red-baiting, given that McCarthyism had waned only a few years before she began work on Death and Life.

Zukin also parts company from Jacobs on the role of the state. Jacobs was communitarian, according to Zukin, looking to the community rather than the state for solutions to social problems. Zukin, on the other hand, is a strong believer in the need for government to promote and protect equity measures, saying, “I can’t emphasize enough how important laws are, zoning laws, rent controls, commercial rent controls”. Zukin faults Jacobs for not using her writing and activism to demand “stronger zoning laws to encourage a mix of housing, factories, stores and schools," noting that "she did not support more permanent rent controls to ensure a mix of poorer and richer tenants, of successful businesses and start-ups.”

Criticism of "creative class" theory 

Zukin disagrees with Richard Florida's influential and controversial theory on the role of the "creative class" in the economic growth of post-industrial cities. While he has since revised his ideas somewhat, Florida originally argued that cities that wish to thrive must cater to the tastes and social preferences of artists and other urban professionals who do "creative" work, and that doing so would ultimately benefit all urban residents. Zukin called that idea "silly," countering, "A city only survives on the basis of diversity and different classes of people, all working, and it’s necessary for local government to make sure there is space for everybody in the city."

Selected awards 
Jane Jacobs Urban Communication Award for Naked City, Urban Communication Foundation (2012)

C. Wright Mills Award from the Society for the Study of Social Problems for Landscapes of Power (1991)

Robert and Helen Lynd Award for Career Achievement in Urban Sociology from the Community and Urban Sociology section of the American Sociological Association. (2007)

Selected works 
Beyond Marx and Tito (Cambridge University Press, 1975)
Loft Living: Culture and Capital in Urban Change (Johns Hopkins University Press, 1982, rev. ed. Rutgers University Press, 1989)
Landscapes of Power: From Detroit to Disney World (University of California Press, 1991)
The Cultures of Cities (Blackwell, 1995)
Point of Purchase : How Shopping Changed American Culture (Routledge, 2004)
Naked City: The Death and Life of Authentic Urban Places (Oxford University Press, 2010)

Edited books:
Industrial Policy: Business and Politics in the United States and France (Praeger, 1985)
Structures of Capital (with Paul DiMaggio, Cambridge University Press, 1990)
After the World Trade Center (with Michael Sorkin, Routledge, 2002)

Zukin has also authored many journal articles and regularly speaks to both public and academic audiences. See her Brooklyn College faculty page for a more complete list of her scholarly activities and contributions.

Personal life 
She grew up in Philadelphia and lives in Manhattan with her husband, a furniture maker turned interior designer.

Education 
AB (Bachelor of Arts), Barnard College, 1967 

PhD, Columbia University, Political Science, 1972

See also 
Greenwich Village
Loft
Real estate
Soho
The City as a Growth Machine (theory)

References

External links 
Brooklyn College faculty profile
Blog posts by Sharon Zukin on Oxford University Press website

1946 births
Living people
Barnard College alumni
American sociologists
Brooklyn College faculty
Graduate Center, CUNY faculty
Urban sociologists
American women sociologists
Scientists from Philadelphia
21st-century American women